Prelude No. 4 is a guitar piece written by Brazilian composer Heitor Villa-Lobos.

The piece is subtitled "Homenagem ao índio brasileiro" (Homage to the Brazilian Indian), is in the key of E minor, marked "Lento", and is the fourth of the Five Preludes, written in 1940. The others are in E minor, E major, A minor, and D major. It was first performed, together with its four companions, by Abel Carlevaro in Montevideo on 11 December 1942.

References

Further reading
 Appleby, David P. 1988. Heitor Villa-Lobos: A Bio-Bibliography New York: Greenwood Press. .
 Béhague, Gerard. 1994. Villa-Lobos: The Search for Brazil's Musical Soul. Austin: Institute of Latin American Studies, University of Texas at Austin. .
 Santos, Turíbio. 1985. Heitor Villa-Lobos and the Guitar, translated by Victoria Forde and Graham Wade. Gurtnacloona, Bantry, County Cork: Wise Owl Music. 
 Wright, Simon. 1992. Villa-Lobos. Oxford Studies of Composers. Oxford and New York: Oxford University Press.  (cloth);  (pbk).

External links

Compositions by Heitor Villa-Lobos
1940 compositions
Villa
Compositions in E minor